Kumbi is a town and a Municipality in Bishnupur District in the Indian state of Manipur. The Kumbi Constituency of Manipur Legislative Assembly was named after the village. It is 55 km far away from Imphal, capital city of Manipur.There is one Government Primary Health Centre (PHCs, sometimes referred to as public health centres, are state-owned rural health care facilities).

External links
 http://villagesinindia.in/manipur/bishnupur/moirang/kumbi_%28pt%29.html
 http://www.electionplans.com/election/state/manipur/constituency/1486/201202/

Cities and towns in Bishnupur district
Bishnupur, Manipur